Hans Baltisberger (born 10 September 1922 - 26 August 1956 Brno) was a German professional Grand Prix motorcycle road racer.

Motorcycle racing career 
Baltisberger was born in the Betzingen District of Reutlingen, Germany. His father was a doctor, he had three sisters and one brother. His best year was in 1954 when he finished the season in fifth place in the 250cc world championship.

Baltisberger was killed while riding a 250cc NSU motorcycle at the 1956 Czechoslovakian Grand Prix, a non-championship event at the Masaryk Circuit in Brno.

References 

1922 births
1956 deaths
People from Reutlingen
Sportspeople from Tübingen (region)
German motorcycle racers
125cc World Championship riders
250cc World Championship riders
500cc World Championship riders
Isle of Man TT riders
Motorcycle racers who died while racing
Sport deaths in Czechoslovakia